Gomo Onduku (born 17 November 1993 in Ekeremor) is a Nigerian footballer who plays as a forward for Abia Warriors. He played in Romania for Concordia Chiajna and CSMS Iași and in Morocco for Nehdat Berkane.

References

External links
 
 
 

1993 births
Living people
Nigerian footballers
Liga I players
Botola players
Veikkausliiga players
Nigeria Professional Football League players
Bayelsa United F.C. players
CS Concordia Chiajna players
FC Politehnica Iași (2010) players
RS Berkane players
FC Ilves players
Nigerian expatriate footballers
Expatriate footballers in Romania
Nigerian expatriate sportspeople in Romania
Nigeria international footballers
Expatriate footballers in Morocco
Nigerian expatriate sportspeople in Morocco
Expatriate footballers in Finland
Nigerian expatriate sportspeople in Finland
People from Bayelsa State
Association football forwards
Abia Warriors F.C. players